Mattathias ben Johanan (Mattīṯyāhū haKōhēn ben Yōḥānān; died 166–165 BCE) was a Kohen (Jewish priest) who helped spark the Maccabean Revolt against the Hellenistic Seleucid Empire.  Mattathias's story is related in the deuterocanonical book of 1 Maccabees.  Mattathias is accorded a central role in the story of Hanukkah and, as a result, is named in the Al HaNissim prayer Jews add to the Birkat Hamazon (grace after meals) and the Amidah during the festival's eight days.

History

Mattathias was from a rural priestly family from Modi'in.  He was a son of John (Johanan) and grandson of Simeon the Hasmonite or son of Hasmon and hence known as the Hasmonean.  Further back, he was the great-grandson of Asmon or Hasmonaeus, a Kohen of the lineage of Joarib known for being the fifth grandson of Idaiah, son of Joarib and grandson of Jachin, in turn a descendant of Phinehas, third High Priest of Israel. Like many priests, he served in the Second Temple in Jerusalem for a period. 

Mattathias was the father of Judas Maccabeus (Judah Maccabee), Eleazar Avaran, Simon Thassi (Simeon), John Gaddi, and Jonathan Apphus (Yonatan). In 168–167 BCE, a series of Seleucid persecutions of traditional Judaism began, spearheaded by King Antiochus IV Epiphanes and possibly High Priest Menelaus as well.  At some point, Mattathias returned to Modi'in.  In 167 BCE, when asked by a Seleucid Greek government representative under King Antiochus IV Epiphanes to offer sacrifice to the Greek gods, he not only refused to do so, but slew with his own hand the Jew who had stepped forward to do so. He then killed the government official that required the act.

Upon the dramatic killing of the official and the Jew, he and his five sons fled to the wilderness of Judea where they began to build a guerilla force of followers.  The area was then known as the Gophna Hills, a region near modern Jifna.  Mattathias then disappears from historical record.  According to 1 Maccabees, he died in the 146th year of the Ancient Macedonian calendar, equivalent to some point between Spring 166 – Spring 165 BCE.

Context

This was the first step in the Maccabean Revolt, the result of which was Jewish independence, which had not been enjoyed for more than 400 years. The events of the war of the Maccabees form the basis for the holiday of Hanukkah, which is celebrated by Jews on the 25th of Kislev (on the Hebrew calendar, corresponding to mid-November to late December in the Gregorian calendar).

Descendants
The Jewish historian Josephus also presents information that appears to show Herod the Great as also being of Maccabean (Hasmonean) descent.
 Eleazar Maccabeus called Auran brother of Judas Maccabeus
 Jason son of Eleazar 
 Antipater I son of Jason
 Antipater II Antipas son of Antipater I
Herod the Great son of Antipater II who was married to Mariamne I who was also of Maccabean (Hasmonean) descent being descended from John Hyrcanus son of Simon Thassi.

In literature and liturgy
The story of the Maccabees can be found in the deuterocanonical book of 1 Maccabees, in Josephus, and in Talmudic references (Shabbat 21b, Shabbat 23a – related to the candles). He is also made reference to in chapter 28 of 1 Meqabyan, a book considered canonical in the Ethiopian Orthodox Tewahedo Church. The "Al HaNisim" prayer, added into the Amidah and Birkat Hamazon on Hanukkah, refers to the story of the Maccabees and to Mattathias by name.

See also
Jewish leadership
Hasmonean dynasty

References

Sources

External links

Mattathias ben Johanan entry in historical sourcebook by Mahlon H. Smith

2nd-century BC deaths
Hasmonean dynasty
Year of birth unknown
Maccabees
2nd-century BC clergy
2nd-century BCE Jews
Jewish priests
People in the deuterocanonical books